196 athletes (146 men and 50 women) from Spain competed at the 1996 Summer Paralympics in Atlanta, United States.

Medallists

See also
Spain at the Paralympics
Spain at the 1996 Summer Olympics

References 

Nations at the 1996 Summer Paralympics
1996
Paralympics